Elgabry Ricardo Rangel Especiano (born 3 April 1982 in Tuxpan, Nayarit) is a former Mexican footballer who last played as a midfielder for Coras de Tepic in the Ascenso MX.

Santos Laguna
Rangel began his career with Santos Laguna, and made his debut for them on 25 August 2002 in the Primera División de México Apertura 2002 tournament. In total he made 130 appearances in the Primera Division with Santos, before moving to Estudiantes Tecos for the Primera División de México Apertura 2007 tournament.

Tecos UAG
As of the end of the 2009–10 Primera División de México season Rangel had made 80 Primera appearances for Tecos, scoring on 3 occasions. Rangel scored his first goal for Tecos against Necaxa in the 63rd minute of their match on 14 February 2009.

References

External links
 

1982 births
Living people
Liga MX players
Santos Laguna footballers
Tecos F.C. footballers
Footballers from Nayarit
Mexican footballers
Association football midfielders
People from Tuxpan, Nayarit
Ascenso MX players
Chiapas F.C. footballers
Mineros de Zacatecas players
Coras de Nayarit F.C. footballers